Daniel Graf (born 3 August 1977) is a German former professional footballer who played as a forward. He spent one season in the Bundesliga with 1. FC Kaiserslautern, as well as five seasons in the 2. Bundesliga with Fortuna Köln, Karlsruher SC, and Eintracht Braunschweig. His career was plagued by injuries, which led to him having to retire early from football in 2007.

References

External links

1977 births
Living people
People from Kaiserslautern
Footballers from Rhineland-Palatinate
German footballers
Germany under-21 international footballers
Association football forwards
Eintracht Braunschweig players
Karlsruher SC players
Kickers Offenbach players
SC Fortuna Köln players
1. FC Kaiserslautern players
1. FC Kaiserslautern II players
Bundesliga players
2. Bundesliga players